Curetis siva, the Shiva sunbeam, is  a species of lycaenid or blue butterfly found in Asia.

It can be distinguished by the underside hindwing stria in space 6 almost in line with stria in space 5. Female with white areas.

References

siva
Fauna of Pakistan
Butterflies of Asia
Butterflies described in 1954